"Honky Tonk Truth" is a song written by Ronnie Dunn, Kim Williams and Lonnie Wilson, and recorded by American country music duo Brooks & Dunn.  It was released in August 1997 as the first single from their first compilation album The Greatest Hits Collection.   It peaked at #3 on the US Country chart.

Music video
The music video premiered on CMT in August, 1997 and featured NASCAR driver Dale Earnhardt. It was directed by Sherman Halsey. It was shot in Las Vegas. Brooks & Dunn are also seen performing in Caesar's Palace casino, the top balcony of the Rio hotel overlooking the city & in front of the old Caesar's Palace sign on the Strip, displaying song related messages such as, "Liar." Ronnie Dunn was dressed in all black.

Chart positions
"Honky Tonk Truth" debuted at number 41 on the U.S. Billboard Hot Country Songs chart for the week of August 30, 1997.

Year-end charts

References

1997 singles
1997 songs
Brooks & Dunn songs
Songs written by Ronnie Dunn
Songs written by Kim Williams (songwriter)
Songs written by Lonnie Wilson
Song recordings produced by Don Cook
Arista Nashville singles
Music videos directed by Sherman Halsey